Blink is an album from Christian rock band Revive released on June 22, 2010. Blink is their fourth studio album and second release on Essential Records.

Track listing

References 

2010 albums
Revive (band) albums